"Dumdi Dumdi" (Hangul: 덤디덤디; RR: Deomdi Deomdi, stylized as "DUMDi DUMDi") is a song recorded by South Korean girl group (G)I-dle, released on August 3, 2020, by Cube Entertainment and Republic Records as the lead single of the group's single album of the same name.  It was written by member Soyeon, who also produced the song alongside Pop Time who has produced many of Zico and Block B's songs.

"Dumdi Dumdi" was described as (G)I-dle's style of a summer dance song. Musically, it is a tropical-based rhythm with moombahton song featuring lyrics that evoke 'hot, cold, passion and excitement' that are reminiscent of summer and youth. An accompanying music video for the song was uploaded onto (G)I-dle's YouTube channel simultaneously with the single's release. Upon release, the music video broke their own record amassing 17.6 million views in 24 hours. "Dumdi Dumdi" peaked at number eight on the Gaon Digital Chart the week of August 23, nearly a month after release. The song currently holds the record for (G)I-dle's most music show wins in South Korea with 6 wins.

A Chinese version of the song is available only on NetEase Music.

A Japanese version of the song was released on August 26, 2020, for their 2nd Japanese EP Oh My God.

Background

(G)I-dle took a shift in their style of music, from dark and sinister "Hann (Alone)" in summer 2018, '90s-inspired hip-hop cut "Uh-Oh" in summer 2019, and charismatic, intense and dreamy for "Oh My God", to a vibrant and youthful summer song "Dumdi Dumdi" for summer 2020. The single was released in Korean, Japanese and Mandarin language. This is (G)I-dle's first song to feature a Chinese version in their discography. Member Yuqi was credited for "Dumdi Dumdi" Chinese lyrics and guide alongside Z King. Soyeon revealed that she received inspiration for the track from the 2016 Disney's Zootopia. The members of the group participated in visual concept planning such as photos of hair and makeup, and styling that gives a vintage feeling for (G)I-dle type of summer. Hours after the release, Soyeon went live on V Live. She revealed the meaning of "Dumdi Dumdi":

On November 25, a special section on MBC M's Show Champion aired where Soyeon explained the recording process of "Dumdi Dumdi". She revealed that the song was recorded 7 times and the word 'Dumdi Dumdi' were to replicate sounds of drums and a beating heart.

Composition and lyrics
The song is in the key of E major, 123 bpm with a running time of 3:30 minutes. "Dumdi Dumdi" is an upbeat dance pop track song with tropical drum beats and a strong moombahton rhythm with booming percussion. The song has light latin pop influences and a subtle incorporation of the dependably "catchy" whistle hook and the onomatopoeic refrain of "Dumdi Dumdi".

Soyeon explained several specific lyrics on August 3, V Live. "With the hot sun I’m a little crazy / My cheeks are easily flushed", explaining that the sun was an excuse for her to go crazy — "I’m going crazy because of my passion"; "And then I feel dizzy and flushed / Like swimming I start dancing", explaining that she wanted to express something like, "did this person drink?", "kind of dizzy", “so exciting”; "The wind makes my heart beat / The waves make my heart pound", explaining that her youth is like the summer and the wind and waves are the songs; "Like this I want to close my eyes tightly / Forever even if the sun rises", she commented that she wants to live her youth passionately until 100; "When the moon falls asleep and the summer is cooled down / Sing to me the song of the hot time", explaining that she wanted to tell her fans – "when you feel like your passion is cooling off, you have to listen to this song."

Critical reception

"Dumdi Dumdi" was met with generally positive reviews from music critics. Jeff Benjamin writing for Forbes wrote that the song is flirty and fun cut boasting booming percussion, and praised Soyeon for trying out vocal manipulation effects while "simultaneously spitting some of her fastest rhymes to date on the second verse." Brianne Constantino from Myx describe the song as "fun and energetic". One Music PH, a Filipino online music hub owned by ABS-CBN Corporation called the song "an unpredictable and undeniable genre-breaking anthem." In his review for the Clash, Robin Murray described "Dumdi Dumdi" as "immaculate pop banger that walks in its own lane." Journalist C.A. from UdoU PH, regarded the track as "flaunts the boundaries between K-pop’s tropical house and sunkissed island that gives way to a bright refrain" and further added, "all six members flex their signature styles on this addictive bop." Lee Nam-kyung of the MBN Star wrote that "retro concept and summer song are popular in the music industry recently, however, in this comeback, it was refreshing and strong with a vintage feel, and it was also possible to feel a lively and fresh charm that not only snipes the hearts of fans, but also makes the ears easy to listen. In addition, the part where the vocals hum "Dumdi Dumdi", I  could humming just by listening to the melody and lyrics." He concluded positively that "(G)I-dle were able to highlight their own summer in their hip and unique charm, and show the aspect of a concept craftsman that fits the trend." IZM writer Son Kiho opined "the song expresses youthful passion by borrowing the heat of summer, emphasizing the refreshing feeling with the sound of the waves, voice samples, and the moombahton rhythm with a cheerful percussion on the front. Each element of the arrangement faithfully captures the sense of the season by adding the whistle of the chorus, but it is somewhat familiar. The aim of the summer song dilutes the attractiveness of (G)I-dle, who broke away from the existing formula and raised momentum with an independent move, and left a distinctive result as the weight was removed for a more friendly approach." Jason Lipshutz of Billboard deemed the song "have the potential for a successful viral trend – that hook sounds designed to thrive on TikTok". Hong Seon-hwa from Biz Entertainment wrote in his article that (G)I-dle "carried on the legacy of summer songs".

Commercial performance
"Dumdi Dumdi" debuted at number 27 on the Gaon Digital Chart with Gaon index of 13,623,261, number 5 on the Download Chart and number 41 on the Streaming Chart for the week ending August 8, 2020. Additionally, the song debuted at number 15 on the US Billboard World Digital Song Sales chart.

Track listing
Download and streaming
 "Dumdi Dumdi" – 3:30

Digital download and streaming – Oh My God EP
 "Dumdi Dumdi" (Japanese version) – 3:31

Credits and personnel
Credits are adapted from Cube Entertainment, and NetEase Music.

 (G)I-dle – vocals
  Soyeon – producing, songwriting, rap arrangement, audio engineer 
 Minnie – whistle
 Yuqi – Chinese translation, guide
 Pop Time – producing, audio engineer
 Jeon Jae-hee – chorus
 Wooseok of Pentagon - chorus
 Kim Ho-hyun – guitar
 Park Ji-yong – keyboard
 Jeon Bu-yeon  – record engineering, recording engineer
 Gu Jong-pil  – mixing engineer
 Jeong Yoo-ra  – assistant mixing engineer
 Kwon Nam-woo  – mastering engineer
 Z KING – Chinese translation, guide

Live performance
On August 13, 2020, (G)I-dle performed "Dumdi Dumdi" on Soribada Best K-Music Awards. They also performed on Korea On Stage - Suwon Hwaseong Fortress, hosted by the Cultural Heritage Administration and Suwon City and organized by the Korea Cultural Heritage Foundation and KBS Korea Broadcasting Day. The performance was aired on September 3, 2020. On September 3, (G)I-dle performed "Dumdi Dumdi" on VENN's Guest House with Chrissy Costanza.

Promotion
(G)I-dle kicked off promotions by appearing on V Live's LieV on August 4. Miyeon, Minnie and Yuqi appeared as guests on August 5 episode of TMI News's Best summer songs that must be listened in the summer and performed a preview of "Dumdi Dumdi". The group appeared as guest on August 6 episode of SBS Power FM's Cultwo Show. The group partnered up with Makestar to hold a global fan meeting. Fans participating in the video call event, began on August 4–13, was given a limited edition photo card when purchasing the album through Makestar. On August 4, the group attended the broadcast recording for August 11 episode of Arirang's After School Club. (G)I-dle promoted the song on various radio shows, including SBS Power FM Lee Jun's Youngstreet, PlayJ's K-pop star guerrilla, SBS Power FM Park So-hyun's Lovegame, Naver Now Ha Sung-woon's Late Night Idol show, Naver Now Moonbyul's Avengirls, and KBS Cool FM's Park Won's Kiss the Radio. On August 22, Miyeon and Soyeon appeared on Amazing Saturday episode 122. The same day, Soyeon appeared as the first guest on JTBC's Just Comedy new section, I'm Crazy about My MBTI. On August 30, the group appeared on 2 Days & 1 Night's Special Summer Vacation Mission.

To promote the song, (G)I-dle launched the hashtag #dumdidumdi and Dumdi Dumdi Challenge, a dance challenge with the song on various social media platforms such as TikTok, Twitter and Instagram. The challenge is said to be "dynamic yet easy-to-follow performances" leading the participation of numerous South Korean artists dancing to it, including Hyoyeon of Girls' Generation, Seulgi of Red Velvet, Namjoo of Apink, Moonbyul of Mamamoo, Eric Nam, broadcaster Park So-hyun, comedian Yoo Jae-pil, Ravi, Choi Yoo-jung of Weki Meki, Natty, Jeon Woong and Kim Dong-hyun of AB6IX, and other artists from Cube Entertainment Jo Kwon, CLC's Sorn, Pentagon's Yuto, Kino and Wooseok, and Yoo Seon-ho.

The group promoted the song with a series of live performances on various music programs starting with Mnet's M! Countdown on August 6. This was followed by performance on SBS's Inkigayo, SBS MTV's The Show, MBC Music's Show Champion, and KBS's Music Bank. (G)I-dle has also performed the song live, including during the group's attendance at 2020 Soribada Best K-Music Awards.

Music video
An accompanying music video for "Dumdi Dumdi" was uploaded to (G)I-dle's official YouTube channel on August 3, 2020. It was choreographed by Lee Jung-lee who had previously choreographed Itzy's "Wannabe", Twice's "More and More", Somi's "What You Waiting For" and Blackpink's "How You Like That".  It was directed by director Jang Jaehyeok and Lee Kyeongsoon of Bibbidi Bobbidi Boo production team. The producer is Kim Soohan and assistant director, Lee Hohyeon. Other key personnel were directors of photography Acam Yang Gyunsang and Bcam Kim Deokjung, while the camera crew was Kim Jinhyeong, Seon Hoseong, Hwang Gyoha and Yang Hyeonu. The Gaffer were Park Jaegwang, Jeon Eunyeong as the Art Director and lighting crew Lee Minsoo, Lee Hyeonsu, Jung Mungyun, Lee Seonmin, Jung Yujin and Kim Hamin. The video featured Yong Yong the iguana. The members took a style transformation with members in retro style outfits and stand out accessories to emphasize the coolness.

The video begins with a statement, "When the sun strikes the heart of the desert, the wandering souls come across each other at an outdated motel where human vestiges are barely traceable... There is a special life story behind each soul, and together, they end up spending the most burningly compelling day of their lives." In the background of an outdated desert with exotic elements such as iguanas and parrots, campers and horses, showing members with different stories meeting at a sleepy motel to hold a summer party. As the video progressing, the scenes overall change into colourful and vivid colours, giving a contrasting look to the intro part of the film. It has a little reminiscent of the fashion and vibes usually seen at American summer music festivals like Coachella and Burning Man. The music video also incorporates summer essentials such as a camping car, bonfire, swimming pool, colorful confetti and fancy outfits. In the video, Miyeon, an actress on her vacation alone; Minnie the wanderer enjoying her freedom; the homebody Soojin; Soyeon riding a convertible, Yuqi the cowgirl crossing the dessert and a part-time waitress, Shuhua. The video cuts to Soyeon, stood in front of an old motel located in the middle of the desert, carrying a large bag of luggage and was surprised by the discovery of Shuhua in the cafeteria. Towards the end, they end up becoming friends, having the time of their lives and leaving their troubles behind.

A dance performance music video was released through the Mu:fully official YouTube channel.

A retro-style lyric video was released on August 7, 2020. The video contains party sets and animals that appear in the music video of "Dumdi Dumdi".

On August 11, the dance practice video for "Dumdi Dumdi" was released on both (G)I-dle's official YouTube and V Live channel.

Reception
The music video surpassed 10 million views in 10 hours, breaking its own record which was 2 hours faster than "Oh My God". The music video garnered 17.6 million views on YouTube in 24 hours, surpassing their previous record with "Oh My God" which gained 17 million views. In addition, the music video ranks on YouTube real-time trending in 35 regions around the world, including 3rd in South Korea, 2nd in Paraguay, 3rd in Chile, and 5th in Brazil. It later went on exceeding 18 million views in Sina Weibo in 18 hours, and ranked 25th in Weibo's real-time search query. The related hashtag on Weibo has received 130 million interactions. On August 5, the music video hit 30 million views, becoming the group's fastest music video in 40 hours.

Usage in media
"Dumdi Dumdi" was featured on August 16, episode 343 The Return of Superman, and on August 20, episode 8 Flower of Evil. On August 25, a snippet of the song's chorus was played on TV Chosun's . On September 1, "Dumdi Dumdi" was played as the opening song for Sporty Sisters, a variety show featuring South Korean female athletes.

Accolades
"Dumdi Dumdi" managed to achieve a total of 6 music show trophies by August 2020 including double crowns (two consecutive wins) on Show Champion, M Countdown and Inkigayo,

Charts

Weekly charts

Monthly charts

Year-end chart

Release history

See also
 List of K-pop songs on the Billboard charts
 List of Inkigayo Chart winners (2020)
 List of M Countdown Chart winners (2020)

References

External links

(G)I-dle songs
2020 singles
2020 songs
Cube Entertainment singles
Korean-language songs
Republic Records singles
Songs written by Jeon So-yeon